The House of Stanisław Borek was a residence at Wawel Castle in Kraków, Poland.

It was constructed in 1551 for the canon Stanisław Borka, who was a diplomat and secretary of King Sigismund I the Old. Only its foundations are left remaining and there are intentions to reconstruct it.

See also 
 St George's Chapel, Wawel Castle
 St Michael's Chapel, Wawel Castle

Literature 
 Kazimierz Kuczman, Wzgórze Wawelskie: Przewodnik; [Państwowe Zbiory Sztuki na Wawelu, Ministerstwo Kultury i Sztuki, Zarząd Muzeów i Ochrony Zabytków], Kraków 1988, wyd. drugie.

Wawel